Jugovići most commonly refers to the Serbian mythological heroes, the Jugović brothers.

Jugovići may also refer to:

 Jugovići, Nevesinje, Bosnia and Herzegovina
 Jugovići, Gacko, Bosnia and Herzegovina
 Jugovići, Nikšić, Montenegro
 Jugovići, Loznica, Serbia